MSF may refer to:

Organizations
 Manufacturing, Science and Finance, a UK trade union (now part of Unite)
Marxist Student Federation (UK), in the UK
 Mathematical Sciences Foundation, an Indian institution for education and research
 Médecins Sans Frontières (sometimes rendered in English as Doctors Without Borders), humanitarian-aid non-governmental organization
 Mind Science Foundation
 Ministry of Social and Family Development, in Singapore
 Misfits Gaming, a professional esports organization whose shortened name is "MSF"
 Motorcycle Safety Foundation, the US organization that promotes motorcycle safety
 Muhammad Subuh Foundation, a Subud charitable foundation
 Multiservice Switching Forum or MultiService Forum, a telecommunications industry association
 Muslim Students Federation (disambiguation), in India
 Muslim Safety Forum, in the UK

Science and technology
 Methanesulfonyl fluoride
 Microsoft Solutions Framework, for delivering information technology solutions
 Multi-Stage Flash, a water desalination process
 MSF, former call sign of Time from NPL
 Mail summary file (.msf), a Mork computer file extension
 Magnetic stripe facility (MSF) usually has several bytes of capacity which provides devices to read data from or to write data to. Mostly can be seen on passbooks or legacy credit cards.

Other uses
 Fleet minesweeper (United States Navy hull classification symbol); See Raven-class minesweeper
 Militaires Sans Frontieres, (Soldiers Without Borders) a fictional mercenary group; see List of characters in the Metal Gear series
 Master of Science in Finance
 Military Science Fiction
 Mundane science fiction - a subgenre of science fiction